Senator Merriam may refer to:

Eugene R. Merriam (born 1944), Minnesota State Senate
Frank Merriam (1865–1955),California State Senate